AD 37 (XXXVII) was a common year starting on Tuesday (link will display the full calendar) of the Julian calendar. At the time, it was known as the Year of the Consulship of Proculus and Pontius (or, less frequently, year 790 Ab urbe condita). The denomination AD 37 for this year has been used since the early medieval period, when the Anno Domini calendar era became the prevalent method in Europe for naming years.

Events

By place

Roman Empire 
 March 18 – The Roman Senate annuls Tiberius's will, and proclaims Caligula as Roman Emperor, nullifying the joint claim of Tiberius Gemellus. Caligula's attempt to have himself deified creates friction between himself and the Senate.
 October – Caligula becomes seriously ill, or perhaps is poisoned. He recovers from his illness, but Caligula turns toward the diabolical: he starts to kill off those who are close to him, whom he sees as a serious threat.

By topic

Earthquake 
 April 9 – An earthquake destroys Antioch.

Religion 
 Abilene is granted to King Agrippa I.
 Peter the Apostle founds the Church of Antioch (approximate date).
 The Pharisee Saul of Tarsus is converted to Christianity, after a vision. After the year 39, he is recognised as Saint Paul.

Births 
 December 15 – Nero, Roman emperor (d. 68 AD)
 Josephus, Romano-Jewish historian (d. c. 100 AD)

Deaths 
 March 16 – Tiberius, Roman emperor (b. 42 BC)
 May 1 – Antonia the Younger, daughter of Mark Antony and Octavia the Younger; grandmother of Caligula (b. 36 BC)
 Lucius Arruntius (the Younger), Roman politician
 Marcus Junius Silanus, Roman politician (b. c. 26 BC)
 Maroboduus, king of the Marcomanni (b. c. 30 BC)

References 

0037

als:30er#37